"Black Fender" is an English language single by Swedish singer Hans Edler done as a tribute to Ricky Nelson. He performed the song during his live tour "Hans Edler meets Ricky Nelson" in December 2006. It has grown into a huge crowd favorite and sang at almost all his later concerts until he decided to release it as a single.

The song was finally released at the end of September 2010, making it straight to number one in the Swedish Singles Chart in its first week of release.

Charts

See also
List of Swedish number-one hits

References

2010 singles
Number-one singles in Sweden
2010 songs
Song articles with missing songwriters